Palazzo baronale (Italian for Baronial Palace)  is a  fortified palace in Archi, Province of Chieti (Abruzzo).

History

Architecture

References

External links

Baronale (Archi)
Archi, Abruzzo